Zoi Mafalda Marques de Lima (born 7 October 1991, Toronto, Canada) is a Portuguese gymnast. She competed for Portugal at the 2012 Summer Olympics, finishing at rank 53 in the women's artistic qualification with a score of 49.631 on 29 July.  She also competed at four World Championships (2009, 2010, 2011 and 2014) and two European Championships (2015 and 2016).

References

1991 births
Living people
Portuguese female artistic gymnasts
Olympic gymnasts of Portugal
Gymnasts at the 2012 Summer Olympics
Gymnasts at the 2015 European Games
European Games competitors for Portugal

Canadian people of Portuguese descent